The Journey's End is a 1921 American silent drama film directed by Hugo Ballin and starring Mabel Ballin, George Bancroft and Wyndham Standing.

Film
The film has no subtitles, which was unusual for a silent film.  Its marketing made note of the fact that it was the first serious drama to not use subtitles.  This distinguished it from The Old Swimmin' Hole which came out earlier in 1921 but had a simpler plot.

Cast
 Mabel Ballin as The Girl
 George Bancroft as The Ironworker
 Wyndham Standing as The Mill Owner
 Georgette Bancroft as The Child
 John T. Dillon as The Uncle

References

Bibliography
 Munden, Kenneth White. The American Film Institute Catalog of Motion Pictures Produced in the United States, Part 1. University of California Press, 1997.

External links

 

1921 films
1921 drama films
1920s English-language films
American silent feature films
Silent American drama films
American black-and-white films
Films directed by Hugo Ballin
Films distributed by W. W. Hodkinson Corporation
1920s American films